The Waihou River is located in the northern North Island of New Zealand. Its former name, Thames River, was bestowed by Captain James Cook in November 1769, when he explored  of the river from the mouth. An older Māori name was "Wai Kahou Rounga".  A 1947 Geographic Board enquiry ruled that the official name would be Waihou.

Geography
In its lower reaches, the river and the nearby Piako River form the wide alluvial Hauraki Plains. The bridge was infamous for the queues of vehicles travelling to and from the Coromandel Peninsula until a new two lane bridge was opened in December 2011. Tributaries include the Waimakariri Stream, Waiomou Stream, Oraka Stream and the Ohinemuri River.

There was a water column of 150 m. Other parts of the river had been cleared in the same manner in previous years.

In the 1910s stopbanks and floodgates were constructed along the Waihou River in order to protect farmland from flooding, including a canal constructed at the point where the Waihou River and Ohinemuri River meet, west of Paeroa. Further work occurred in the 1980s after extensive flooding in 1981.

History

Many areas on the banks of the Waihou River were settled by Hauraki Māori, such as Oruarangi pā and Paterangi pā near Matatoki, and the Te Raupa pā and Waiwhau pā near Paeroa.

Recreation
The crystal-clear waters of the Waihou River provide ideal fishing. The river supports large populations of rainbow and brown trout. A survey conducted in 2009 showed that the upper section of the river supported over 700 fish per kilometre.

References

External links
 
 1:50,000 map of source of Waihou River
South Waikato District Council: Te Waihou Walkway to Blue Spring - with link to youtube video

Thames-Coromandel District
Rivers of Waikato
Rivers of New Zealand
Firth of Thames
Hauraki Gulf catchment